Stanley J. Powell (19 July 1916 – ) was a Welsh rugby union, and professional rugby league footballer who played in the 1930s, 1940s and 1950s.

Background
Stan Powell was born in Risca, Wales, he died aged 78 in Southport, Merseyside.

Playing career

International honours
Powell won caps for Wales (RL) while at St. Helens against England at Central Park, Wigan during March 1945, and while at Warrington in 1947.

Championship final appearances
Stan Powell played , i.e. number 5, in Warrington's 15-5 victory over Bradford Northern in the Championship Final during the 1947–48 season at Maine Road, Manchester.

References

External links
Profile at saints.org.uk
Statistics at wolvesplayers.thisiswarrington.co.uk

1916 births
1995 deaths
Broughton Rangers players
Castleford Tigers players
Cilfynydd RFC players
Footballers who switched code
Lancashire rugby league team players
Oldham R.L.F.C. players
Rugby league centres
Rugby league five-eighths
Rugby league fullbacks
Rugby league halfbacks
Rugby league players from Caerphilly County Borough
Rugby league wingers
Rugby union players from Risca
St Helens R.F.C. players
Wales national rugby league team players
Warrington Wolves players
Welsh rugby league players
Welsh rugby union players